The second season of the television comedy Portlandia premiered on IFC in the United States on January 6 and ended on March 9, 2012 with a total of 10 episodes.

Production
On February 14, 2011, a second season of ten episodes was ordered and began airing on January 6, 2012, at 10 pm ET/PT. Guest stars for this season include Penny Marshall, Jack McBrayer, Tim Robbins, Robin Pecknold, Andy Samberg, Joanna Newsom, Amber Tamblyn, Mary Lynn Rajskub, Kristen Wiig, Edward James Olmos, James Callis, St. Vincent, Isaac Brock, LaMarcus Aldridge, Shohreh Aghdashloo, Ed Begley, Jr., Jeff Goldblum, Sean Hayes, Miranda July, Kumail Nanjiani, Eddie Vedder and Ronald D. Moore.

Cast

Main cast
 Fred Armisen
 Carrie Brownstein

Special guest cast
 Kyle MacLachlan as Mr. Mayor

Guest stars

a Also has an uncredited role as Man in Line in "Brunch Village".

Episodes

References

External links 

Ultimate Character and Episode Guide
 

Portlandia (TV series)
2012 American television seasons